The 1917 Belfast South by-election was held on 9 April 1917.  The by-election was held due to the incumbent Irish Unionist MP, James Chambers, becoming Solicitor-General for Ireland.  Chambers was re-elected unopposed.

Results

External links 
A Vision Of Britain Through Time

References

1917 elections in Ireland
1917 elections in the United Kingdom
South, 1917
Unopposed ministerial by-elections to the Parliament of the United Kingdom in Irish constituencies
20th century in Belfast